Oleksii Mykolaiovych Arestovych (born 3 August 1975) is a Ukrainian intelligence officer, blogger, actor, political and military columnist, and propagandist. He was a speaker of the Trilateral Contact Group on Ukraine. He worked as a Strategic Communications Advisor of the Office of the President of Ukraine from December 2020 to January 2023.

Early life
Oleksii Arestovych was born in Dedoplistsqaro, Georgia. His father was a Belarusian Pole and mother a Russian from Voronezh Oblast, Arestovych spent a significant part of his childhood in Belarus. In 1992, he graduated from school No. 178 in Kyiv.

He entered the Faculty of Biology, Taras Shevchenko National University of Kyiv. In 1993, Arestovych began to perform in the modern Kyiv studio theatre Black Square Theater, and left school.

He started conducting psychological seminars and trainings in 2000. In 2003, he entered the author's school "Man among People" by psychologist Absalom Podvodny, from which he graduated in 2010. He also studied theology at the Superior Institute of Religious Sciences of St. Thomas Aquinas.

He is an active blogger, with almost 200,000 followers on Facebook and more than 1.2 million (April 2022) on YouTube. Arestovych was among the top 100 bloggers in Ukraine in a poll published by Fakty ICTV in 2019.

Military career 
Arestovych is a graduate of the Odesa Military Academy, he has a diploma of military translator. According to data that need further confirmation, from 1994 to 2005 he worked in the Chief Directorate of Intelligence of the Ministry of Defence of Ukraine and is a reserve lieutenant colonel.

Since 2014, he has been preparing combat units under the People's Reserve program, organizer of a charity fund to provide psychological support to the military in the Anti-terrorist Operation Zone (2014–2017).

From September 2018 to September 2019, he served in the Joint Forces Operation near Kramatorsk in the 72nd Mechanized Brigade as an intelligence officer.

Political career
In 2005, Arestovych joined the far-right Brotherhood political party, led by Dmytro Korchynskyi. In that period, he repeatedly took part in conferences and events of the Eurasia Movement of Aleksandr Dugin, where he actively opposed the Orange Revolution. Arestovych, as the Deputy Chairman of Korchynskyi's Brotherhood Party, appeared next to Dugin in Moscow and delivered a speech against the prospect of Ukraine's NATO and EU integration. Arestovych said that "the West cannot give Ukrainians the opportunity to preserve their culture, but instead will begin to reprivatize strategically important objects. Ukrainian factories will be taken over by Washington and Brussels."

At the beginning of 2009, together with Korchynskyi, he organized the citizens' initiative "Get everyone out", the task of which was "to get the authorities to solve the main problems of small and medium-sized enterprises and the country's motor carriers".

In June 2009, he was appointed deputy head of the Prymorskyi District Administration of the Odesa City Council, but he was dismissed after three months at his own request.

On 28 October 2020, Arestovych was appointed by Leonid Kravchuk as Adviser on Information Policy and official speaker of the Ukrainian delegation to the Trilateral Contact Group on Ukraine at the Minsk talks on resolving the War in Donbas. On 1 December 2020, the Head of the Office of the President of Ukraine Andriy Yermak appointed Oleksiy Arestovych his freelance advisor on strategic communications in the field of national security and defense. Kravchuk, the head of the Trilateral Contact Group, noted that Arestovych's candidacy was chosen because of his military experience and the presence of a vision and position on issues that are the subject of the Trilateral Contact Group.

After the start of the 2022 Russian invasion of Ukraine, Arestovych became known for his 2019 prediction on the inevitability of a war with Russia. From the start of the invasion on 24 February 2022, he held daily briefings on the situation, as an adviser to the Head of the Office of the President of Ukraine. These videos garnered him a significant following.

From 24 February 2022 until he resigned, Arestovych held daily briefings on the current situation regarding the Russian invasion of Ukraine, as an Adviser to the Head of the Office of the President of Ukraine.

He also holds informal daily conversations covering the invasion on lawyer Mark Feygin's YouTube channel.

Arestovych is an organizer of psychological seminars and trainings and a charity fund for psychological support to the military.

In August 2022, Arestovych announced that he plans to run for the presidency of Ukraine if Volodymyr Zelenskyy does not run for a second term.

On 14 January 2023, Arestovych made a comment that a Russian Kh-22 missile had destroyed a multi-story residential building in Dnipro after being hit by an Ukrainian air defense counterattack, while the Ukrainian position is that Ukrainian forces did not try to intercept the missile.  On 16 January 2023 Russian President Vladimir Putin's press secretary Dmitry Peskov said Arestovych's 14 January explanation about what happened in Dnipro was plausible and put the blame for the destruction on the Ukrainian side. Following the outrage regarding Arestovich's comments, he apologized and resigned on 17 January 2023.

Awards

Commemorative badge of the Chief Directorate of Intelligence of the Ministry of Defence of Ukraine (July 2014)
Commemorative award of the Main Intelligence Directorate of the Ministry of Internal Affairs “Yevhen Berezniyak”
Medal of the Commander of the Ukrainian Ground Forces “For Special Service” (July 2019)
Distinction of the President of Ukraine “For participation in the anti-terrorist operation”
Breastplate “Badge of Honor” (May 2019)

Notes

References

External links
 YouTube Channel
 
 

1975 births
Living people
People from Kakheti
Independent politicians in Ukraine
Ukrainian colonels
Ukrainian translators
Ukrainian YouTubers
Ukrainian people of Belarusian descent
Ukrainian people of Polish descent
Ukrainian people of Russian descent
Georgian people of Belarusian descent
Georgian people of Polish descent
Georgian people of Russian descent
Georgian people of Ukrainian descent
Expatriates from Georgia (country) in Belarus
Expatriates from Georgia (country) in Ukraine
Odesa Military Academy alumni
20th-century people from Georgia (country)
21st-century people from Georgia (country)
20th-century Ukrainian people
21st-century Ukrainian politicians
Propaganda in Ukraine